Market Street Tunnel may refer to:

Market Street Subway, carrying Bay Area Rapid Transit (BART) and Muni light rail under Market Street, San Francisco
Market Street Tunnel, part of the Market–Frankford Line in Philadelphia, crosses the former Junction Railroad
Market Street Tunnel, part of the Junction Railroad in Philadelphia, and crosses the Market–Frankford Line
Center City Commuter Connection, carrying commuter rail trains a block north of Market Street in Philadelphia